Retreat is an unincorporated community in Vernon Township, Jackson County, Indiana.

History
Retreat first grew around a sawmill which was built there in about 1850.

Geography

References

Unincorporated communities in Jackson County, Indiana
Unincorporated communities in Indiana